Tha Kham is a khwaeng (subdistrict) in Bang Khun Thian District, Bangkok.

History
The name "Tha Kham" literally means "crossing pier", refers to "crossing khlong (canal) pier" owing to there is a ferry pier by Khlong Sanam Chai also known as Khlong Dan, a main waterway in the area.

Tha Kham and Bang Khun Thian area is a settlement of the Mon people since the Ayutthaya period. The great evacuation of the Mons from Samut Songkhram took place during the reigns of King Rama III and Rama IV in the early Rattanakosin period.

The traditional occupation of locals is rice farming, including fruit orchards, with a network of canals was dug for communications, irrigation and flood control. Although the rice farming profession has now disappeared from the area. But in the sermon hall of Wat Tha Kham temple, which is more than 160 years old, there are also murals on the ceiling of the hall, reflecting the rice farming and dressing of the Mons in the past.

Geography
Tha Kham is the southern part of the district, with total area of 84.712 km2 (32.707 mi2), considered as the largest sub-district of Bangkok and is also the only area that is adjacent to the sea. The coastline is about 4.7 km (2 mi) long, and this muddy landscape is home to mangrove forests, which are the only mangrove forests in Bangkok.

These mangrove trees serve a vital purpose in protecting the environment and have several functions. In addition, the mangrove forests in Tha Kham are also habitat to the last herd of long-tailed macaques (Macaca fascicularis) and the last smooth-coated otters (Lutrogale perspicillata) in Bangkok.   

Its terrain is a narrow strip of land between the provinces of Samut Prakan and Samut Sakhon.

The area is bounded by other places (from north clockwise): Samae Dam in its district, Bang Mot and Thung Khru in Thung Khru District, Khlong Khun Racha Pinitjai in Na Kluea, Ban Khlong Suan and Laem Fa Pha of Phra Samut Chedi District in Samut Prakan Province, Bay of Bangkok (upper Gulf of Thailand), and Khlong Bang Sao Thong in Phan Thai Norasing of Mueang Samut Sakhon District in Samut Sakhon Province, respectively.

Tha Kham is also filled with seafood restaurants and fish ponds, especially on both sides of Bang Khun Thian Chai Thale Road (Bang Khun Thian Coastal Road).

Environmental issues
Tha Kham experiences seawater eroding the coast an average of 30 meters (98 ft) a year, as well as a risk from the industrial waste discharged from the factories in the vicinities.

Population
In the year 2018, it had a population of 58,962 people. Most of residents engaged in vegetable and fruit farming as well as fish, shrimp, crab and cockle farming.

Important places
Wat Tha Kham
Wat Hua Krabue
Pittayalongkorn Pittayakhom School
Bang Khun Thien Museum
Taweethapisak Bangkhunthian School
Bang Khun Thian Geriatric Hostipal
Thin Doem Khun Kala (macaque scenic viewpoint)
Prince Chumphon Shrine
Guanyin Shrine
Brahminy Kite Scenic Viewpoint (only brahminy kite scenic viewpoint in Bangkok and central region)
28th Milestone of Bangkok & 29th Milestone of Bangkok (only two Bangkok boundary markers are in the sea)

References

Bang Khun Thian district
Subdistricts of Bangkok

Gulf of Thailand